Sinking ships for wreck diving sites is the practice of scuttling old ships to produce artificial reefs suitable for wreck diving, to benefit from commercial revenues from recreational diving of the shipwreck, or to produce a diver training site.

To avoid undesirable ecological impact, and to maximise utility, the vessel should be selected and prepared, and the site chosen, with due consideration to the local environment.

Preparation 
To prepare a hulk for sinking as a wreck site, several things must be done to make it safe for the marine environment and divers. To protect the environment, the ship is purged of all oils, hydraulic fluids, and dangerous chemicals such as PCBs. Much of the superstructure may be removed to prevent the hazard of it eventually caving in from corrosion. Similarly, the interior of the ship is gutted of components that corrode quickly, and would be dangerous to divers if they came loose. The ship is thoroughly cleaned, often with the help of volunteers interested in diving. A significant part of the cost of preparing and sinking the ship may be recovered from scrapping the contents of the ship, including valuable materials such as copper wiring. The hulk's suitability as a diving site may be enhanced by cutting openings in its hull and interior bulkheads, and removing doors and hatch covers to allow divers access at reduced risk.

Choice of site
Several factors influence the choice of site for recreational diving purposes, and these should take into consideration the possibly conflicting economic and ecological considerations. 
 The wreck should not create a significant hazard to navigation. 
 For maximum accessibility and diver safety, a shallow site in protected waters is preferred.
 To reduce cost of access, the site should be near to a suitable harbour or launching site, in a region where existing or planned recreational diving infrastructure is available. 
 There may be a conflict of interests between groups which may profit from access to the wreck. 
 Sites further offshore make shore dives impracticable or dangerous. 
 Deeper water reduces access to less qualified divers, but increases risk for all divers.
 More protected waters reduce risk to all divers and increase the useful lifespan of the wreck as a diving attraction. 
 Placement of the wreck will do some ecological damage. An ecological impact assessment should indicate acceptable long term consequences.
 The site will influence the marine organisms that will colonise the wreckage, and the rate at which they will grow. Some may be more desirable at a dive site than others.
 The site will influence the rate of silt deposition in and on the wreckage, which will affect safety and the local ecology.

Sinking 
The preparation phase usually removes a significant amount of weight, so the ship floats higher in the water than normal. This may make it necessary to stabilise the vessel by filling some compartments with water as makeshift ballast tanks to prevent excessive rolling in port or during towing. The ship is towed to the sinking location, usually in waters shallow enough to allow access by numerous divers, but deep enough to be relatively unaffected by surface weather conditions. The ship is usually scuttled using shaped explosives, in a controlled demolition. The holes may be blown so that the heavier engine room and stern floods first, then the rest of the hull. The aim is to sink the ship in an upright position.

Reception
The sinking of ships as recreational dive sites can provide wreck diving opportunities where they previously did not exist, and can provide wrecks which are particularly suitable for penetration by less skilled and experienced divers, when they have been prepared for the purpose by removing potential hazards and contents which would contaminate the site or region. However, some divers see them as artificial, less interesting and less challenging, and prefer to explore the relatively unknown or mysterious surroundings of historic and significant wrecks which occurred outside planned scuttling events, considering them to be more authentic. Scuttling programs may relieve more culturally significant wreckage from overexploitation, particularly incidental damage by less competent divers, but do not remove the threat of illegal intentional damage by removal of artifacts by wreck-robbers, who will target wrecks where there are more likely to be artifacts worth stealing.

List of ships sunk for wreck diving

See also

References

Artificial reefs
 
Shipwrecks